Island Generating Station (also known as Island Cogeneration Ltd.) is a natural gas-fired station owned by Capital Power Corporation, in  Campbell River, British Columbia, Canada.  The plant operates as a co-generation facility under a 20-year power purchase agreement with BC Hydro while steam is supplied to Elk Falls Mill.

Description 

The Power Station consists of one 254 MW gas turbine (supplied by ABB).

See also

List of natural gas-fired power stations in Canada
List of generating stations in British Columbia

References

Campbell River, British Columbia
Natural gas-fired power stations in British Columbia
Energy infrastructure completed in 2002
2002 establishments in British Columbia